"The Couch" is the 91st episode of NBC sitcom Seinfeld. This was the fifth episode for the sixth season. It aired on October 27, 1994. In this episode, George joins a book club, Jerry buys a new couch which acquires an unsanitary stain, Poppie and Kramer collaborate on a pizza-making business, and Jerry puts Elaine's stance on abortion to the test in social situations.

Plot
Jerry buys a new couch, giving his old one to Elaine. Elaine falls for Carl, the man who delivers Jerry's couch.

Kramer plans to start a "pizza business where you make your own pie". He starts the business with Poppie, who has bounced back from his troubles with the Board of Health in the season five episode "The Pie". Jerry and Elaine go to Poppie's restaurant for a dinner of duck, but get into a discussion in which Poppie tells them he is anti-abortion. Elaine walks out in protest. Other diners overhear the discussion, causing numerous arguments to break out. Hoping to cause further trouble for his amusement, Jerry asks Elaine what Carl's stance is on abortion. She breaks up with him after finding out that he is anti-abortion, despite being madly in love.

Poppie ends up in the hospital as a result of the disruption Jerry and Elaine caused in the restaurant. Kramer rebukes them, and they send Poppie wine and five-alarm chili as an apology. Poppie is offended by the gift since he has a gastrointestinal disorder. After his release from the hospital, he comes to Jerry's apartment to get payment for the duck dinner and his gastrointestinal disorder causes him to unconsciously urinate on Jerry's new couch. Jerry gives the couch to George, who is unconcerned about the stain as he can turn the cushion over. Jerry takes his old couch back from Elaine. While in her apartment to move the couch, Elaine offers Carl something to drink. She throws him a bottle of grape juice, but it breaks and spills on the couch.

Kramer's pizza business with Poppie ends because Poppie objects to Kramer putting cucumbers on his pizza. Poppie and Kramer get into an argument that alludes to the theme of abortion.

George's girlfriend gets him to join her book club, which is assigned to read Breakfast at Tiffany's. George struggles to focus on the book and visits video stores in an unsuccessful attempt to rent the movie instead. After a video store clerk declines George's request to call the customer who has rented the movie, George surreptitiously peeks at the computer screen to see who has the rental copy. He heads to the renter's apartment and asks if he can watch the movie with the renter and his daughter. Before he can see the movie's ending, George accidentally spills grape juice on the family's couch and is kicked out of their apartment. When the book club meets, he remarks that Holly Golightly got together with her neighbor Paul "Fred" Varjak. Since this did not happen in the book, only the movie, George's girlfriend realizes that he did not read it.

Production

The opening scene at the furniture store was significantly abridged after filming. Among the cuts was George professing his enthusiasm for velvet; despite being cut before broadcast, this speech is referred back to several times during season six.

The episode is the television debut of Patton Oswalt, who played the video rental clerk.

References

External links 
 

Seinfeld (season 6) episodes
1994 American television episodes
Television episodes written by Larry David